Brest Albatros Hockey is an ice hockey team in Brest, France. They were founded in 1991, and currently play in the FFHG Division 1, the top level of ice hockey in France. Albatros won the league championship in 1996 and 1997. The team also previously played in the Ligue Magnus.

Achievements
Ligue Magnus champion (2) : 1996, 1997.

External links
Official website
club profile on eurohockey.com

Ice hockey teams in France
Sport in Brest, France